Bernhard Seikovits (born July 24, 1997) is an Austrian professional football tight end for the Arizona Cardinals of the National Football League (NFL). He played for the Vienna Vikings of the Austrian Football League from 2007 until joining the Cardinals via the NFL's International Player Pathway Program in 2021.

Career

Vienna Vikings 
Seikovits had played for the Vienna Vikings junior teams since age 10. He then joined the Vikings senior team in the Austrian Football League and became one of the top receivers in the league. He was also the captain of the Austria national American football team and won two European Championships as a quarterback for the country's Under-19 team.

Arizona Cardinals 
Seikovits was assigned to the Arizona Cardinals of the National Football League (NFL) as a part of the league's International Player Pathway Program. He joined the team in training camp, and can be added to the practice squad afterward thanks to an exemption that would allow the Cardinals to carry an extra player. He was waived on August 31, 2021 and re-signed to the practice squad the next day. He signed a reserve/future contract with the Cardinals on January 19, 2022.

On August 30, 2022, Seikovits was waived by the Cardinals and signed to the practice squad the next day. He signed a reserve/future contract on January 11, 2023.

References 

Living people
International Player Pathway Program participants
Austrian players of American football
Sportspeople from Vienna
Austrian expatriate sportspeople in the United States
Arizona Cardinals players
1997 births
Expatriate players of American football